Thomas Mark Harris (born 29 December 1998) is a Welsh professional footballer who plays for  club Cardiff City and the Wales national team. A versatile forward, he is able to play as a winger or as a striker.

He has represented Wales at under-17, under-19, under-20 and under-21 level. He turned professional at Cardiff City in December 2016, and spent the 2018–19 season on loan at Newport County and Port Vale. He spent the first half of the 2019–20 season on loan at Wrexham, before breaking into the Cardiff first-team during the 2020–21 campaign.

Club career
Harris began his career at Cardiff City and was offered his first professional contract at the club in December 2016. He made his first-team debut on 8 January 2017, coming on as a substitute for Greg Halford in a 2–1 defeat to Fulham in the FA Cup. A series of illnesses and injuries throughout the Cardiff squad gave Harris the chance to make his Championship debut on 22 April, playing in a five-man midfield in a 0–0 draw at Wigan Athletic. Speaking after the match, manager Neil Warnock said that "I thought he did okay but I felt sorry for him because we were so poor in that area". He made one further appearance in the 2016–17 season, though did not feature in the "Bluebirds" 2017–18 promotion campaign.

On 2 August 2018, Harris joined League Two side Newport County on an initial six-month loan deal. He made his debut for the "Exiles" on 11 August, in a 1–0 victory over Crewe Alexandra at Rodney Parade. He scored his first goal for the club seven days later, in a 1–1 draw at Exeter City. After initially establishing himself in the first-team, Harris suffered a concussion while on international duty and was unable to regain his place on his return due to the form of fellow forwards Jamille Matt and Pádraig Amond. He made a total of 20 appearances in all competitions during his loan spell, scoring three times, before returning to the Cardiff City Stadium in January 2019 despite Newport manager Mike Flynn's statement that he was confident of extending the loan deal.

On 23 January 2019, he signed for struggling League Two side Port Vale on loan for the remainder of the 2018–19 season. He made three starts and three substitute appearances for the "Valiants" before being allowed to return to Cardiff early by manager John Askey after going five weeks without a first-team game.

On 24 June 2019, Harris signed for National League club Wrexham on a season-long loan. "Red Dragons" manager Bryan Hughes commented that "he'll fit in well to our system. He can play across front three and he is an exciting talent". Harris scored his first goal in his second game for Wrexham, in their 2–2 draw at Boreham Wood on 6 August. He then followed that up with goals in the next two games, in a 2–1 loss at Dover Athletic and then getting the only goal of the game against F.C. Halifax Town at the Racecourse Ground. However he lost his first-team place under new manager Dean Keates and his loan was terminated early on 7 January.

Harris came off the bench to make his first appearance of the 2020–21 season in a 3–2 defeat away at Queens Park Rangers on 31 October. On 28 November, Harris started his first game of the season and scored his side's second goal in a 4–0 victory over Luton Town, his first senior goal for the club. With Neil Harris favouring his namesake over £5.5 million signing Robert Glatzel, his inclusion in the starting eleven was seen as a gamble by Harris. He partnered well with Kieffer Moore however, until Moore was sidelined with injury after six games. Harris then faced stiff competition in the second half of the campaign after new manager Mick McCarthy signed Max Watters and utilised wingers Josh Murphy and Sheyi Ojo as strikers. He went on to score impressive goals in comfortable wins over Preston North End and Birmingham City to end the season with three goals in 17 appearances.

He made 17 starts and 17 substitute appearances in the 2021–22 Championship campaign as Cardiff looked to intergrade more Welsh players into the first-team. Speaking in February, manager Steve Morison said that he was giving Harris a run in the starting eleven due to his impressive work in training and was rewarded as he scored his fourth goal of the campaign.

International career
Harris represented Wales at under-17 level, scoring the winning goal against Montenegro in Minsk to secure Wales a place in the Elite Round of qualification for the 2015 UEFA European Under-17 Championship. He went on to be called up to the under-19 team and on 12 November 2016 he scored Wales' second goal of a 3–2 victory over England, only to score an own goal two minutes later; despite the victory Wales failed to qualify for the 2017 UEFA European Under-19 Championship. In May 2017, Rob Page named Harris in the Wales under-20 squad for the 2017 Toulon Tournament. After making his debut for the side in the tournament opener against Ivory Coast as a substitute in place of Tyler Roberts, Harris was named in the starting line-up in Wales' remaining two group matches against France and Bahrain as Wales were eliminated in the group stage. He made a total of two appearances for the under-17s, five appearances for the under-19s and three appearances for the under-20s. Harris made his debut for the under-21 side on 1 September 2017, coming on as a substitute in place of Tyler Roberts in a 3–0 victory over Switzerland.

On 30 August 2021, Harris received his first call up to the senior squad as manager Rob Page sought replacements for the injured Aaron Ramsey, Joe Rodon, George Thomas and Neco Williams. He made his debut on 5 September, replacing clubmate Rubin Colwill in the 57th-minute of a 3–2 victory against Belarus in a 2022 FIFA World Cup qualification game. In November 2022, he was named in the Wales squad for the 2022 FIFA World Cup in Qatar.

Style of play
Harris is a versatile forward, able to play as a striker, winger, or behind the striker. Harris has said that "I don't mind playing up front in a two, my main strength I would say is running in behind and getting at defenders". Newport County manager Mike Flynn stated that "he's a good finisher, makes intelligent runs, and is very quick".

Career statistics

Club

International

References

External links

1998 births
Living people
Welsh footballers
Wales youth international footballers
Wales under-21 international footballers
Wales international footballers
Association football forwards
Association football wingers
Cardiff City F.C. players
Newport County A.F.C. players
Port Vale F.C. players
Wrexham A.F.C. players
English Football League players
2022 FIFA World Cup players